James Bayley may refer to:
James Roosevelt Bayley (1814–1877), first Bishop of Newark, New Jersey
James Bayley (cricketer), English cricketer
James Bayley (politician) (1882–1968), Australian politician
James Bayley (tennis) (1899–1981), Australian tennis player

See also
James Bailey (disambiguation)
James Baillie (disambiguation)
James Bailie (1890–1967), Northern Irish unionist politician